From Emperor to Citizen (literally translated as The First Half Of My Life) is the autobiography of Puyi, the last emperor of China.

The book has three editions:
 First Edition (1960): Written by Pujie, the little brother of Puyi. The account and narration in the book ends in 1957, and the book was published by Xinhua Bookstore in January, 1961.
 Second Edition (1964): Written by Wen-Da Li and was thought of as the final version. Published by Qunzhong publishing house in 1964. Due to the social environment and political atmosphere at the time of publishment, around 160,000 words were deleted from this manuscript.
 Full version (2007): the full version restored 160,000 words deleted from the second edition.

Bibliography 
 愛新覺羅·溥儀，《我的前半生》，群眾出版社, 1960年，2冊，621頁
 愛新覺羅·溥儀，《我的前半生》，群眾出版社, 1964年，304頁
 愛新覺羅·溥儀，《我的前半生》，群眾出版社, 2007年，509頁 
 羅雪揮，《“全本”溥儀：〈我的前半生〉版本流變》，《中國新聞周刊》2006年第47期。

Chinese memoirs
Puyi
Books about Manchukuo
1960 books